22nd meridian may refer to:

22nd meridian east, a line of longitude east of the Greenwich Meridian
22nd meridian west, a line of longitude west of the Greenwich Meridian